George Ayisi-Boateng is a Ghanaian diplomat and a member of the New Patriotic Party of Ghana. He is currently Ghana's ambassador to South Africa.

Ambassadorial appointment 
In July 2017, President Nana Akuffo-Addo named George Ayisi-Boateng as Ghana's ambassador to South Africa. He was among twenty two other distinguished Ghanaians who were named to head various diplomatic Ghanaian mission in the world.

References

Year of birth missing (living people)
Living people
High Commissioners of Ghana to South Africa